Marques D. Sullivan (born February 2, 1978 in Chicago, Illinois) is a former professional American football offensive lineman for the Buffalo Bills, the New York Giants, the New England Patriots and the Chicago Rush.

Early life
Sullivan was a multi-sport athlete at Fenwick High School, lettering in football, wrestling, and bowling.  In football, Sullivan played on both the offensive and defensive line.  In 1995, Sullivan was one of the top three offensive lineman in the country achieving All-American and All-State honors helping the Friars reach a 12-1 record. He was named all-state by the Chicago Sun-Times and the Champaign-Urbana News Gazette, and a high school All-American by Parade.

College career
Marques was one of the most highly recruited high school offensive lineman in the country. He decided to accept a scholarship to play college football for the Illinois Fighting Illini. As a redshirt freshman, Sullivan was an offensive tackle, starting in all eleven games for the Illini.

His sophomore year, Sullivan started eleven games at right tackle.

His junior year, he started all twelve games at left tackle and was named All-Big Ten second-team. The Illini played in the MicronPC.com Bowl, finishing with an 8-4 season. Sullivan was named to the All-Bowl team after the season.

His senior year, he was named first-team Playboy All American, third-team FWAA All-American, as well as an honorable mention Football News All-American. He was also named All Big Ten second-team that same year.

Sullivan graduated from the University of Illinois with a degree in Recreation, Sport and Tourism Management.

Professional career
Sullivan was selected in the fifth round of the 2001 NFL Draft by the Buffalo Bills. In his rookie season, he played in 12 games and started two games at offensive tackle.

Sullivan started 25 games for the Bills for the 2002 and 2003 seasons, blocking for Pro Bowlers Travis Henry and Drew Bledsoe. In 2002, Sullivan was named Most Improved Player by the Buffalo Bills.

In 2004, he played for the New York Giants and the New England Patriots. Sullivan retired from football in 2007 after playing for the Chicago Rush in the same year.

He is involved with many charitable causes in the Chicago area. He served the Director of the Chicago NFL Alumni Football Camp, coaching high school aged children. Sullivan also coached for the Chicago Bears Youth Football Camp coaching children ages 6–13. Sullivan also served the NFL Alumni its executive vice president of the Chicago Chapter and as a vice president of the National Football League Former Player's Association - Chicago Chapter.

On July 10, 2008 North Park University announced that Sullivan would be the football team's new offensive line coach.

Sullivan is currently the Vice President of the NFL Retired Players Association - Chicago Chapter. He is also a board member of post-graduate prep school, Midwest Prep Academy.

Personal life
Sullivan is married to former U.S. national level gymnast, Veronica Saldana Sullivan.

References

External links
 http://www.nfl.com/players/playerpage/235166
 http://sportsillustrated.cnn.com/football/nfl/players/5592/

1978 births
Living people
Players of American football from Chicago
American football offensive tackles
Illinois Fighting Illini football players
Buffalo Bills players
New York Giants players
New England Patriots players